Events in the year 2021 in Gabon.

Incumbents 

 President: Ali Bongo Ondimba
 Prime Minister: Rose Christiane Ossouka Raponda

Events 

 13 March – The country's COVID-19 vaccination program began after 100,000 doses of the Sinopharm BIBP vaccine was donated by China.
11 June – During the 2021 United Nations Security Council Elections, Gabon was elected to serve a two-year term as a non-permanent member of the UN Security Council, beginning in 2022. It will mark the fourth time Gabon has sat on the Security Council.

Deaths

References 

 
2020s in Gabon
Years of the 21st century in Gabon
Gabon